The enzyme trimethylamine-oxide aldolase catalyzes the chemical reaction

trimethylamine N-oxide  dimethylamine + formaldehyde

This enzyme belongs to the family of lyases, specifically the aldehyde-lyases, which cleave carbon-carbon bonds.  The systematic name of this enzyme class is trimethylamine-N-oxide formaldehyde-lyase (dimethylamine-forming). Other names in common use include trimethylamine N-oxide formaldehyde-lyase, trimethylamine N-oxide aldolase, trimethylamine N-oxide demethylase, and trimethylamine-N-oxide formaldehyde-lyase.  This enzyme participates in methane metabolism.

References

 
 

EC 4.1.2
Enzymes of unknown structure